The Decorah Community School District is a rural public school district located in Decorah, Iowa, United States.
The district is almost entirely in Winneshiek County, with a small portion in Allamakee County. In addition to Decorah, the census-designated place of Burr Oak is in the district boundary. Other unincorporated areas in the district include Bluffton, Freeport, Hesper, Highlandville, Locust, and Nordness.

History

In 2001 the North Winneshiek Community School District ended its high school program. That year it entered into an agreement with Decorah CSD to allow students from its boundary to attend Decorah High School.

In the 2012-2013 school year the district had 1,419 students.

In 2016, the North Winneshiek district agreed to consolidate with the Decorah CSD. Reasons for the decision to consolidate were rising costs and declining enrollment. As a part of the consolidation process, North Winneshiek 7th and 8th grade students began to attend Decorah Middle School at the beginning of the 2017–2018 school year, before fully consolidating in the 2019–2020 school year.

In 2018 voters in the districts agreed to make the consolidation final, with Decorah voters saying yes on a 621-104 basis and North Winnishiek voters saying yes on a 224-32 basis. Andrew Wind of the WCF Courier described the result as "overwhelming". Effective July 1, 2018 the North Winneshiek district consolidated into the Decorah district.

In 2018 the combined interim board of Decorah CSD and North Winneshiek CSD approved an agreement with Mabel-Canton Public Schools in Minnesota, effective for five years, to allow students in the former North Winneshiek district boundary to attend Mabel-Canton if they choose. The agreement applies to any post-merger Decorah CSD resident who is geographically closer to Mabel, Minnesota, the location of the Mabel-Canton school, than to Decorah, where all Decorah CSD campuses are located.

Schools
School buildings in the district, all of which are in Decorah, include:

Decorah High School
Decorah Middle School
Carrie Lee Elementary
John Cline Elementary
West Side Early Childhood Center (ECC)

North Winneshiek School, which is no longer open, is now in the possession of Decorah CSD, which spent $88,000 on upkeep from July 1, 2019 through January 27 of the following year.

See also
List of school districts in Iowa

References

External links
Official website

School districts in Iowa
Education in Winneshiek County, Iowa
Education in Allamakee County, Iowa
Decorah, Iowa